is a railway station in the city of Kani, Gifu Prefecture, Japan.

Lines

Station layout
Kanigawa Station has two opposed ground-level side platforms connected by a level crossing. The station is unattended.

Platforms

Adjacent stations

|-
!colspan=5|Meitetsu (Nagoya Railroad)

History
It was renamed  from November 1, 1943 to December 1, 1949, when it reverted to it former name. It was renamed to its present name on November 10, 1949.

Surrounding area
Kayaba Industry
Kani River

See also
 List of Railway Stations in Japan

References

External links
 
  

Railway stations in Japan opened in 1925
Stations of Nagoya Railroad
Railway stations in Gifu Prefecture
Kani, Gifu